Paranamera is a genus of longhorn beetles of the subfamily Lamiinae, containing the following species:

 Paranamera ankangensis Chiang, 1981
 Paranamera excisa Breuning, 1942
 Paranamera malaccensis Breuning, 1935
 Paranamera oculata Hüdepohl, 1994

References

Lamiini